The Primex Tower (stylized as PRIMEX Tower) is an office skyscraper under-construction in San Juan, Metro Manila, Philippines.

Background
Real estate developer, Primex Corporation announced in 2017 that it would be building the Primex Tower.
 The groundbreaking ceremony for the building was held a year later on July 11, 2018.

With a total of 50-storeys including basement level/s, the Primex Tower will become the tallest building in San Juan, Metro Manila upon its completion. It will have  of total leasable office space.

In December 2020, Primex secured a deal with Accor to open Pullman Hotel Manila at the Primex Tower. The hotel under Accor's Pullman hotel brand will occupy the building's ten topmost floors.

References

Buildings and structures in San Juan, Metro Manila
Hotels in Metro Manila
Pullman Hotels and Resorts
Buildings and structures under construction in Metro Manila